"Los Maté" is a reggaeton song performed by Tego Calderón for his album The Underdog/El Subestimado. The song was released as the album's lead single in late 2006 and became a reggaeton hit, peaking inside the top ten on the majority of the charts it entered. This single was released with Jiggiri Records (Tego Calderón's label) and Atlantic Records. A remix featuring Arcángel and Chyno Nyno has been made.

Background
In the booklet of The Underdog/El Subestimado, Tego Calderón states that "Los Maté" is a dis track. The reason that he released the lead single as a dis track is that the meaning of The Underdog/El Subestimado is that others tried to take Tego out of the game, but failed to do so. The track disses Lito & Polaco, and Tego eventually stopped releasing dis tracks once El Abayarde Contraataca was released. The song background and begging comes from a song from Roberto Cantoral called "El preso numero 9".

Track listings and formats
Digital download single
 "Los Maté" - 2:53

Music video
The music video for "Los Maté" was the album's first music video filmed. During this time, Tego Calderón was getting a lot of airplay. The music video reflects what the song lyrics express. Other than the guys holding the guitars and a woman, Tego Calderón is the only person seen in the music video. Tego Calderón raps while the woman dances reggaeton, and expresses that the others failed to take him out of the game.

Remix
A remix of "Los Maté" has also been made. It features artists Arcángel and Chyno Nyno. The chorus is sung differently, and Tego Calderón changes his rap. Although the remix hasn't been on any of Tego's albums, it has been on many mixtapes including mixtapes by DJ Sin-Cero. The remix is another dis to Lito & Polaco.

Credits and personnel
 Writers: 
 Tegui Calderon Rossario
 Ernesto F. Padilla
 Antonio Cantoral Garcia
 Roberto Cantoral
 Publisher: 
 Malito Music, Inc.
 Ernesto F. Padilla
 Peer International Corp.
 Producer: DJ Nesty
 Naldo
 Studio: Flow Music Studio
 Recorded by: DJ Nesty
 Mixed by: Gary Noble

Chart performance

References

External links
 Tego Calderon's official website

2006 singles
Spanish-language songs
Tego Calderón songs
Songs written by Nesty (producer)
2006 songs
Atlantic Records singles
Songs written by Tego Calderón